Lasippa tiga, the Malayan lascar, is an Indomalayan butterfly of the family Nymphalidae. It was first described by Frederic Moore in 1858. The larva feeds on Cratoxylon species (shrubs or small to medium-sized trees).

Subspecies
L. t. tiga Java
L. t. camboja (Moore, 1879) Assam to Thailand, Langkawi
L. t. siaka (Moore, 1881) Peninsular Malaya, Sumatra
L. t. niasana (Fruhstorfer, 1900) Nias
L. t. siberuta (Corbet, 1942) Mentawai

References 

Limenitidinae
Butterflies described in 1858